Princess Turandot (German: Prinzessin Turandot) is a 1934 German comedy film directed by Gerhard Lamprecht and starring Käthe von Nagy and Willy Fritsch. A separate French-language version, Turandot, Princess of China, was also released.

The script, by Thea von Harbou, includes elements of Puccini's opera Turandot and Friedrich Schiller's adaptation of Carlo Gozzi's 1762 play Turandot. It was shot at the Babelsberg Studios in Berlin. The film sets were designed by the art directors Robert Herlth and Walter Röhrig. The music was by Franz Doelle with song lyrics by Bruno Balz and C. Amberg (including the opening Turandot, bezaubernde Turandot - 'enchanting Turandot'), and the sound engineer was Dr. Fritz Seidel.

Cast
Willi Schaeffers as The Emperor
Leopoldine Konstantin as The Empress
Käthe von Nagy as Princess Turandot
Inge List as Mian Li
Willy Fritsch as Kalaf, the bird-dealer
Paul Kemp as Willibald
Aribert Wäscher as the judge
Paul Heidemann as Prince of Samarkand
Gerhard Dammann as executioner
Ernst Behmer as the fruit dealer
Edlef Schauer as the barber's clerk
Angelo Ferrari
Rudolf Biebrach
Gaston Briese
Alexander Engel
Willi Grill
Karl Hannemann
Karl Hellmer 
Eduard Kandl
Werner Kepich
Bertold Reissig
Hans Sternberg

References

External links
Complete film of Prinzessin Turandot on YouTube

1934 comedy films
German comedy films
Films of Nazi Germany
Films directed by Gerhard Lamprecht
German multilingual films
Films based on works by Friedrich Schiller
Films with screenplays by Thea von Harbou
UFA GmbH films
German black-and-white films
1934 multilingual films
Films based on works by Carlo Gozzi
Works based on Turandot (Gozzi)
1930s German films
Films shot at Babelsberg Studios